Antonio Riberi (15 June 1897 – 16 December 1967) was a Monegasque prelate of the Catholic Church. He served as the fifth apostolic nuncio to Ireland and later as the nuncio to Spain from 1962 until his death. He was elevated to the cardinalate in 1967.

Biography
Born in Monte Carlo, Riberi studied at the seminary in Cuneo, Italy, and the Pontifical Gregorian University and Pontifical Ecclesiastical Academy in Rome, where he was ordained to the priesthood on 29 June 1922. He then furthered his studies until 1925 at the Institute of Social Sciences in Bergamo. From 1925 to 1930, Riberi served as attaché and secretary of the Bolivian nunciature. He was raised to the rank of an honorary chamberlain of his holiness on 1 May 1925, and made counselor of the nunciature to Ireland in 1930.

On 13 August 1934, Riberi was appointed titular archbishop of Dara. He received his episcopal consecration on the following 28 October from Cardinal Pietro Fumasoni Biondi, with Archbishops Giuseppe Pizzardo and Carlo Salotti serving as co-consecrators. Riberi was later named apostolic delegate to the African missions dependent of the Sacred Congregation for the Propagation of the Faith on 4 November of that same year. During this time, he resided in Mombasa, Kenya. Archbishop Riberi, from 1939 to 1946, headed the Vatican's assistance service for the prisoners of war and wounded soldiers of the Second World War.

Appointed nuncio to China on 6 July 1946, he once declared in 1951, following petitions (from the Communist Party of China) for an independent Catholic Church in that country, that "the Catholic religion ... is superpolitical, indivisible by national boundaries or political differences ... Any so-called Independent Catholic Church ... is simply a schismatic church and not the true and one Catholic Church". He was later expelled by the Communist regime in September of that year for "espionage activities", remarking, "I leave with sorrow, and my prayer is constantly for the Chinese people, for our priests, for our sisters and the faithful". Riberi became nuncio to Ireland on 19 February 1959, and to Spain on 28 April 1962. From 1962 to 1965, he attended the Second Vatican Council.

He was created cardinal-priest of San Girolamo della Carità by Pope Paul VI in the consistory of 26 June 1967, but died some months later in Rome, at age 70. Cardinal Riberi is buried in his family's tomb in Limone Piemonte.

References

External links
Catholic-Hierarchy

Cardinal Riberi's sermon to the Legionaries of Christ

1897 births
1967 deaths
Monegasque cardinals
Monegasque Roman Catholics
Apostolic Nuncios to China
Apostolic Nuncios to Ireland
Apostolic Nuncios to Spain
Participants in the Second Vatican Council
Cardinals created by Pope Paul VI